Fabio Zúñiga is the name of:

Fabio Zúñiga (footballer, born 1979), Colombian footballer
Fabio Zúñiga (soccer) (born 1981), American soccer player